The Orphan is a 1960 Hong Kong drama film directed by Lee Sun-Fung and starring a then eighteen-year-old Bruce Lee. The film is based on the novel of the same Chinese title by Au-yeung Tin. The Orphan was filmed in the early months of 1959 and was the last film that Lee made in Hong Kong during his teenager years before leaving to the United States in 1959. The film was ranked number 52 of the Best 100 Chinese Motion Pictures at the 24th Hong Kong Film Awards.

Plot
During the outbreak of the Sino-Japanese War, Ho See-kei lost his wife Lan and his daughter while also being separated from his son To and his maid Sister Five. After the war, Ho became the headmaster of an orphanage and foils orphan Sam's plan to rob rich man, Cheung Kat-cheung, and widow Yiu So-fung. Ho persuades Sam to rehabilitate and returns the things that he had stolen. Ho invites Fung to teach at the orphanage while also successfully persuading Sam to enter school.

One night, Sam misses his family and quietly leaves to see the Cheung family's maid Sister Five. Fung mistakenly thought he was joining the gang and scolds him. Sam was displeased at Fung and plays a trick on her, which leads to punishment from Ho. Triad leader Kwo-kong Lung takes the chance to threaten Sam to kidnap Cheung's son Sing. Ho goes to Cheung's house to understand the situation and discovers that Sister Five was his maid before the war, while also discovers that Sam is his son. Sam fails to save Sing and got his ear cut off by Lung. He then struggles to return to the orphanage where he acquaints with his father Ho and he repents and leads to police to rescue Sing.

Cast
 Bruce Lee as Sam 
 Ng Cho-fan as Headmaster Ho See-kei
 Yin Pak as Teacher Yiu So-fung
 Fung Fung as Big Brother Kwo-kong Lung 
 Yuet-ching Lee as Sister Five 
 Lee Pang-fei as Cheung Kat-cheung
 Lee Siu-hung as Ming
Ko Lo-chuen as adviser
Ng Tung as informant
Lam Lo-ngok as Lo Yee
Fung Wai-man as Mrs. Cheung
Yeung Kong as teacher
Chung Wai-man as teacher
Chan Wai-yue as Lan
Cheng Kam Hon as Ha
Leung Chun-mat as Sing
Wong Hon as beggar
Cheung Chi-suen as detective
Ko Chiu as police officer

See also
Bruce Lee filmography

References

External links

The Orphan at Hong Kong Cinemagic

1960 films
1960 drama films
Hong Kong drama films
1960s Cantonese-language films
Films set in Hong Kong
Films shot in Hong Kong
Films based on Chinese novels
1960s action drama films